Burlington is a provincial electoral district in southwestern Ontario, Canada. It elects one member to the Legislative Assembly of Ontario.

It was created in 1999 from parts of Burlington South, Halton Centre, and a small part of South Oakville.

When the riding was created, it included the city of Burlington east of a line following the Queen Elizabeth Way  to Highway 403 to King Road and south of a line following Dundas Street to the 403 to Upper Middle Road to Walkers Line.

In 2007, the boundaries were altered so that the riding included all of Burlington south of a line following Dundas Street to Guelph Line to Upper Middle Road to Walker Line to the QEW.

Members of Provincial Parliament

Election results

2022 general election

2018 general election

2014

2011

2007 general

2007 by-election

Following Cam Jackson's resignation to run for mayor of Burlington, the riding was left with a vacant seat at Queen's Park. Consequently, a by-election was called by Ontario Premier Dalton McGuinty on January 10, 2007, to be held on February 8, 2007.  Joan Lougheed, who was defeated by Jackson for the mayor's post, was nominated as the Ontario Liberal Party candidate on January 4, 2007. Former Halton Regional Chair Joyce Savoline became the Progressive Conservative Party of Ontario candidate, after narrowly defeating former Miss Canada Blair Lancaster at their nomination meeting. On January 12, 2007, Brantford school teacher and community activist  Cory Judson defeated former Halton District School Board trustee David Abbott for the Ontario New Democratic Party candidacy. On January 25, 2007, Frank de Jong was named the Ontario Green Party candidate.

2003

1999

2007 electoral reform referendum

References

Sources
Elections Ontario Past Election Results
Map of Riding for 2018 election

Ontario provincial electoral districts
Politics of Burlington, Ontario